Tit Linda Sou (born August 21, 1989, in Phnom Penh) is a female track and field sprint athlete who competes internationally for Cambodia.

Sou represented Cambodia at the 2008 Summer Olympics in Beijing. She competed at the 100 metres sprint and placed seventh in her heat without advancing to the second round. She ran the distance in a time of 12.98 seconds.

References

External links
 

1989 births
Living people
Cambodian female sprinters
Olympic athletes of Cambodia
Athletes (track and field) at the 2004 Summer Olympics
Athletes (track and field) at the 2008 Summer Olympics
Sportspeople from Phnom Penh
Olympic female sprinters